Franklintown is also the name of a neighborhood in Philadelphia.

Franklintown is a borough in York County, Pennsylvania, United States. The population was 511 at the 2020 census.

Geography
Franklintown is located at  (40.076671, -77.029619).

Demographics

As of the census of 2000, there were 532 people, 211 households, and 147 families living in the borough. The population density was 2,154.3 people per square mile (821.6/km2). There were 222 housing units at an average density of 899.0 per square mile (342.9/km2). The racial makeup of the borough was 98.68% White, 0.19% African American, 0.56% Native American and 0.56% Asian. Hispanic or Latino of any race were 0.94% of the population.

There were 211 households, out of which 38.4% had children under the age of 18 living with them, 54.0% were married couples living together, 11.8% had a female householder with no husband present, and 30.3% were non-families. 21.8% of all households were made up of individuals, and 3.3% had someone living alone who was 65 years of age or older. The average household size was 2.52 and the average family size was 2.93.

In the borough the population was spread out, with 29.1% under the age of 18, 8.5% from 18 to 24, 44.4% from 25 to 44, 12.6% from 45 to 64, and 5.5% who were 65 years of age or older. The median age was 29 years. For every 100 females there were 100.8 males. For every 100 females age 18 and over, there were 89.4 males.

The median income for a household in the borough was $43,409, and the median income for a family was $47,813. Males had a median income of $33,571 versus $22,315 for females. The per capita income for the borough was $18,882. About 6.7% of families and 9.6% of the population were below the poverty line, including 19.7% of those under age 18 and 6.9% of those age 65 or over.

References

Populated places established in 1813
Boroughs in York County, Pennsylvania
1869 establishments in Pennsylvania